Kim Sung-hyun,  known as Andrew Kim, was a Korean-American intelligence officer and head of the Central Intelligence Agency's Korea Mission Centre.

Education

Born in South Korea, in the city of Pyeongchang. Kim was educated at Seoul High School alongside Suh Hoon. He is cousin of Chung Eui-yong, the director of South Korea's National Security Office.

CIA career

He served in Moscow, Beijing and Bangkok and later as station chief in Seoul for the Central Intelligence Agency. He retired but returned to lead the Korea Mission Centre. Kim is viewed as a hawk on North Korea.

References

American people of South Korean descent
People of the Central Intelligence Agency